Rolling Thunder Mountain is in the northern Teton Range, Grand Teton National Park, Wyoming. The peak is located northwest of Moran Bay on Jackson Lake and access to the peak involves navigating through several miles of backcountry areas of Snowshoe Canyon where there are no maintained trails.

References

Mountains of Grand Teton National Park
Mountains of Wyoming
Mountains of Teton County, Wyoming